Michael Dunlop (born 10 April 1989) is a Northern Irish professional motorcycle racer. Part of a motorcycle racing dynasty, Michael is the brother of the late William Dunlop, son of Robert and nephew of former World Champion Joey Dunlop.

He won the Armoy road race on 27 July 2019 just 16 days after breaking his pelvis. The victories were Dunlop's 18th and 19th around his home circuit at Armoy.

Dunlop was the first rider in the history of the Isle of Man TT to achieve a lap of the course in under 17 minutes. 

Dunlop was described in 2015 as having "an aggressive style" which was "spectacular to watch". This pugnacious attitude has led to numerous confrontations with race teams, rival competitors and on occasion, his late brother. In addition he has often refused to acknowledge the names of his fellow competitors.

Early racing

He made his TT debut in 2007, where his best finish was 25th in the Superbike TT. He made the decision to ride in the 2008 races at the last minute after the death of his father at the North West 200 earlier in the year. He finished 10th in the Senior TT with a fastest lap of 124.773 mph, making him the fastest Dunlop around the TT Course. Dunlop joined his father and uncle Joey in the record books in 2009 when he won the Supersport TT race on a 600cc Yamaha.

Dunlop has also won at the North West 200, recording his only victory to date at the 250 cc race in 2008. His father was killed during practice for this event.

Dunlop took part in the Classic Superbike race at the Manx GP on Friday 31 August. He took the win in the Classic Superbike race at the Manx Grand Prix 2012. This was his sixth title on the Mountain Course and his third Manx Grand Prix race win following his debut, and victory, in the 2006 Newcomers MGP race. During the two-week 2012 Manx GP  Dunlop worked in the pits for a team in the 600 Junior Race.

2015 

At the start of the 2015 Road Racing season, Dunlop had a poor start with race team Milwaukee Yamaha, and during the practice week of the 2015 Isle of Man TT, he dramatically left Yamaha to rejoin his previous team, BuildBase BMW, in order to give him the best chance of a good result.

2016 

In February 2016, it was announced that Dunlop would again ride BMW in the Superbike class at International road races during the 2016 racing season, provided by Hawk Racing. The announcement was made at the MCN Motorshow at the Excel, confirming that Dunlop will be riding the 2016 BMW S1000RR.

Isle of Man TT
Dunlop opened his account at the 2016 Isle of Man TT Races in the Superbike race, which he led from start to finish. Astride a BMW S1000RR, Dunlop bettered the existing absolute course speed record attained during one-lap, also setting a new average speed for the six lap race of 130.306 mph in a race-record time of 1 hour, 44 minutes, 14.259 seconds for the 226 miles of racing. In addition Dunlop also won the prestigious John Williams Trophy.

Dunlop's second race of the week was the Supersport Junior 600 TT, race 1. The opening lap saw him dicing at the head of the field with Ian Hutchinson. By the end of the four-lap race, Dunlop finished in second place behind Hutchinson. Following routine post-race inspection of the machines, Dunlop's bike was deemed to have infringed race regulations with non-standard parts, and he was subsequently disqualified.
Dunlop returned to the start line for the second race of 6 June, the Superstock TT on a 1000 cc BMW. However, handling difficulties contributed to him retiring from the race at the end of the opening lap.

In the second of the two Supersport Junior races, Dunlop finished second to Hutchinson. For the last race of Dunlop's schedule on Friday 10 June, he led the six-lap Senior TT from lap one, extending his lead over runner-up Ian Hutchinson, winning with a 31-second margin, raising his own absolute lap record speed previously set on Saturday, 4 June by a small amount, and setting a new race record time.

2017 

During the 2016/2017 closed season there were various rumours of possible proposals for 2017. After Hawk Racing's switch from BMW to Suzuki for 2017, Dunlop signed for the Bennett's Suzuki Racing Team campaigning the new Suzuki GSX-R1000 as part of a four-man squad. Dunlop will concentrate on International road races with team mates Sylvain Guintoli and Taylor Mackenzie in British Superbikes and Richard Cooper in National Superstock 1000.

After an introduction to the new machine at Mallory Park, Dunlop pre-season tested with teammates at Circuito de Velocidad de Cartagena and Almeria in Spain for five days. This was followed by a further work up at Donington Park on 22 March.

Isle of Man TT
The qualifying week for the 2017 Isle of Man TT was plagued by poor weather. Following a sporadic week of qualifying the first race day was given over to additional qualifying and practice, which meant the curtain raiser to the meeting, the Superbike TT, was postponed for 24 hours.

Superbike TT

Racing got underway on Sunday, 4 June. Dunlop formed up on the grid at the TT Grandstand on board the Bennett's Suzuki in what were ideal conditions.
Going into the second lap with a slender 1.8 second lead over Dean Harrison, Dunlop continued to head the field until he was forced to retire at Handley's Corner.

Supersport (Race 1)

In the opening Supersport race, Dunlop took his place on the grid astride his familiar MD Racing Yamaha. Dicing for the lead with James Hillier at the end of the opening lap, Dunlop came into the pit stop at the end of lap 2 with a 2.75 second lead. Taking another second from Hillier at the end of lap 3, Dunlop continued to edge ahead on the final lap, coming home with a winning margin of 12.5 seconds.

2018 
At the end of March, 2018, it was announced in a press release by TAS Racing that Dunlop had been signed by the team to campaign factory BMWs in the premier racing categories of the 2018 racing season.

Cookstown 100 
After some pre-season testing with the Tyco BMW squad, Dunlop made his way to the curtain raiser to the Irish Road Racing season, the Cookstown 100. Qualifying third fastest in the Superbike category Dunlop opened his 2018 campaign by taking victory aboard his MD Racing Honda in the Supersport Invitation race.

Dunlop's first competitive outing on the S-1000RR saw him competing in the Open A race. Starting in the lead group he crossed the line at the head of the field only to be awarded second place behind Derek Shiels, losing by 5 seconds on corrected time.

A series of crashes plagued the event, resulting in the cancellation of the remainder of the race programme including the highlight of the meeting, the Cookstown 100 Superbike race.

Isle of Man TT

Superbike TT

Supersport (Race 1)

Dunlop followed up his Superbike TT win with a win in the Supersport category.

Complete TT record

See also
Robert Dunlop
Joey Dunlop
William Dunlop
North West 200
Isle of Man TT
Road (2014 film)

References

 Manx 2012
 MGP 2012 CS race.

External links

Isle of Man Database TT biography
Michael Dunlop Racing Official Website

Isle of Man TT riders
Motorcycle racers from Northern Ireland
People from Ballymoney
British Supersport Championship riders
Living people
1989 births
Michael